Claude de Bouteroue d'Aubigny (1620–1680) was the intendant of New France from 1668 to 1670. His tenure was between two periods served by Jean Talon in that position.

External links

 

1620 births
1680 deaths
Intendants of New France